ROH 18th Anniversary was a scheduled two-night professional wrestling event produced by American promotion Ring of Honor (ROH) that would have taken place on Friday, March 13 and Saturday March 14, 2020, at the Sam's Town Live in the Las Vegas suburb of Sunrise Manor, Nevada. Friday's show was planned to be a pay-per-view broadcast, while Saturday's show was planned to broadcast live on Honor Club. The event was canceled due to the COVID-19 pandemic.

Announced matches at the time of cancellation

Night 1 – PPV

Night 2 – ROH: Past vs. Present

See also
2020 in professional wrestling

References

ROH Anniversary Show
2020 in professional wrestling
2020 in Nevada
Professional wrestling in the Las Vegas Valley
Events in Sunrise Manor, Nevada
March 2020 events in the United States
Sports events cancelled due to the COVID-19 pandemic